Mankat is a large village in Banmauk Township, Katha District, in the Sagaing Region of northern-central Burma. The area is known for its Mankat Forest reserve.

History
S. St. R. Korper, an Assistant Superintendent, was responsible for building a  road from Mankat to Nawpawng, according to a 1920 British report. In World War II, Bernard Fergusson, Baron Ballantrae, then a major, passed through Mankat via Bonchaung Gorge with the Black Watch unit of the 77th Indian Infantry Brigade.in March 1943. The Japanese had a base at Mankat, which was bombed by the US along with Mogok on 4 January 1945. During conflict in the village in 1980, four houses were burned down.

Geography
The village lies in the Nam Pang River valley to the south of Banmauk, and is surrounded by Mankat Forest, a protected forest reserve.

References

External links
Maplandia World Gazetteer

Populated places in Katha District
Banmauk Township